Raginan (also Romanized as Ragīnān) is a village in Abtar Rural District, in the Central District of Iranshahr County, Sistan and Baluchestan Province, Iran. At the 2006 census, its population was 44, in 11 families.

References 

Populated places in Iranshahr County